Andrew Rohrmann, better known by his stage name scntfc (formerly Scientific American), is an American composer and sound designer. His solo productions, which incorporate elements of electronic dance music, hip-hop, and rock, have been used by The Seattle Art Museum, the Sound Unseen Film Festival in Minneapolis and for well-known television ads promoting Hewlett Packard and Discover.

History 
After establishing himself as a member of Seattle's indie rock scene with his band Hush Harbor, scntfc became interested in the idea of using the computer as his primary instrument.

In 2001 Rohrmann formed a production company along with Plastiq Phantom named Polar Empire. They have done commercial compositions for clients such as Nike, MTV, Volkswagen, and AMC. He has completed critically praised remixes for a number of indie favorites including Modest Mouse, 764-Hero, and Red Stars Theory. He has also composed and produced the sound for the 2016 game Oxenfree.

Portfolio

References

External links 
Official website
Polar Empire

Musicians from Washington (state)
Living people
Year of birth missing (living people)